James Adam Mahama (born May 1932) is a Ghanaian politician and teacher. He served as a member of the first parliament of the Second Republic of Ghana for Gonja West constituency in the Northern Region.

Early life and education
Mahama attended Salaga Primary School and Tamale Middle Boarding School, where he obtained a Teachers' Training Certificate.

Politics
During the 1969 Ghanaian parliamentary election, Mahama was elected as a member of the first parliament of the Second Republic on the ticket of the Progress Party. He was succeeded by Yakubu Saaka of the People's National Party in the 1979 Ghanaian general election.

Career
Mahama is a cinematographer and a teacher by profession.

References

1932 births
Progress Party (Ghana) politicians
Ghanaian MPs 1969–1972
People from Northern Region (Ghana)
Ghanaian Muslims
Living people